Luxembourg competed at the 1988 Summer Olympics in Seoul, South Korea.

Competitors
The following is the list of number of competitors in the Games.

Results by event

Archery
In its fourth appearance in Olympic archery, Luxembourg was represented by one woman.

Women's Individual Competition:

Athletics
Men's Marathon

Men's 20 km Walk

Women's Marathon

Swimming
Men's 50m Freestyle

Men's 100m Freestyle

Men's 200m Freestyle

Women's 100m Breaststroke

Women's 200m Breaststroke

References 

Nations at the 1988 Summer Olympics
1988
1988 in Luxembourgian sport